This is a list of the main association football rivalries in the UK.

Football derby matches in the United Kingdom are often heated affairs, and violence is not uncommon. However, the matches and the rivalries they encompass are frequently listed among the best in the sport. A 2008 report showed that West Bromwich Albion vs Wolverhampton Wanderers was the number one rivalry in English football. While Old Firm derby matches between Scottish clubs Rangers and Celtic are known to go beyond the sport with its "enormous quantity of references to wider cultural and political issues". The first football derby played was between Hallam F.C. and Sheffield F.C. in December 1860.

England and Wales

Central England
A420 derby: Oxford United vs. Swindon Town
Aylesbury derby: Aylesbury Vale Dynamos vs. Aylesbury United
Bedford derby: Bedford vs. Bedford Town
Berkshire derby: Maidenhead United vs. Slough Town
Buckinghamshire derby: Milton Keynes Dons vs. Wycombe Wanderers
Cambridge derby: Cambridge City vs. Cambridge United
Small Cambridgeshire derby: Cambridge City or Cambridge United vs. Histon
Cambridgeshire derby: Cambridge United vs. Peterborough United
Colney derby: Colney Heath vs. London Colney
Didcot Triangle derbies: 
A420 derby: Oxford United vs. Swindon Town
M4 derby: Reading vs. Swindon Town
Thames Valley derby: Oxford United vs. Reading
Dunstable derby: AFC Dunstable vs. Dunstable Town
Hertfordshire derby: Hemel Hempstead Town vs. St Albans City vs. Boreham Wood F.C.
Luton-Stevenage rivalry: Luton Town vs. Stevenage
M1 derby: Luton Town vs. Watford
Maidenhead derby: Maidenhead Town vs. Maidenhead United
Milton Keynes-Northampton rivalry: Milton Keynes Dons vs. Northampton Town
Milton Keynes-Peterborough rivalry: Milton Keynes Dons vs. Peterborough United
Nene derby: Northampton Town vs. Peterborough United
Northamptonshire derby: Kettering Town vs. Rushden & Diamonds - can also refer to any of the two against Corby Town or Northampton Town
Northampton-Oxford rivalry: Northampton Town vs. Oxford United
Oxford derby: Oxford City vs. Oxford United
Oxfordshire derby: Didcot Town vs. Oxford City
M40 Oxford-Wycombe rivalry: Oxford United vs. Wycombe Wanderers
University Oxbridge derby: Oxford University A.F.C. vs. Cambridge University A.F.C.

Eastern England
El Basico: Basildon United F.C. vs. Bowers & Pitsea F.C. Can include Billericay Town F.C. and Hashtag United F.C.
Canvey Island derby: Canvey Island vs. Concord Rangers
East Anglian derby (also known as the Old Farm derby): Ipswich Town vs. Norwich City
Colchester-Ipswich derby: Colchester United vs. Ipswich Town
Essex derby: Colchester United vs. Southend United
M11 derby: Bishop's Stortford vs. Harlow Town
Maldon derby: Maldon & Tiptree vs. Heybridge Swifts
Norfolk derby: Gorleston F.C. vs. Great Yarmouth Town
Suffolk derby: 
Leiston vs. Lowestoft Town
Needham Market vs. Lowestoft Town
Bury Town vs. AFC Sudbury

Greater London

 

East London derby: Leyton Orient vs. West Ham United, also may include a match between either of those and Dagenham & Redbridge
North London derby: Arsenal vs. Tottenham Hotspur,
North West London derby:
Arsenal-Chelsea rivalry: Arsenal vs. Chelsea
Chelsea-Tottenham Hotspur rivalry: Chelsea vs. Tottenham Hotspur
Wealdstone-Barnet derby: Wealdstone F.C. vs Barnet F.C.
Harrow derby: Wealdstone F.C. vs Harrow Borough F.C.
South London derby: any match between Charlton Athletic, Crystal Palace, Millwall and AFC Wimbledon.
West London derby: any match between Brentford, Chelsea, Fulham and Queens Park Rangers
Dockers derby: Millwall vs. West Ham United
Dulwich-Tooting derby: Dulwich Hamlet vs Tooting & Mitcham
Enfield derby: Enfield 1893 vs. Enfield Town
Sutton derby: Carshalton Athletic vs. Sutton United
Croydon derby: Croydon F.C. vs. AFC Croydon Athletic
4G Derby: Sutton United v Bromley F.C.

Midlands
A5 derby: Nuneaton Town vs. Tamworth
Buxton-Leek rivalry: Buxton vs. Leek Town
Coventry-Villa rivalry: Coventry City vs. Aston Villa
East Midlands derby: 
Derby-Leicester rivalry: Derby County vs. Leicester City
Derby-Nottingham Forest rivalry: Derby County vs. Nottingham Forest
Leicester-Nottingham Forest rivalry: Leicester City vs. Nottingham Forest
 Lincoln-Mansfield rivalry: Lincoln City vs. Mansfield Town
Derbyshire derby: Chesterfield vs. Derby County
Hinckley derby: Hinckley Leicester Road vs. Hinckley A.F.C.
Hereford-Kidderminster rivalry: Hereford vs. Kidderminster Harriers
Nottingham derby: Nottingham Forest vs. Notts County
Nottinghamshire derby: Mansfield Town vs. Notts County
Number Nine derby: Halesowen Town vs. Stourbridge 
M69 derby: Coventry City vs. Leicester City
Miners strike derby: Chesterfield vs. Mansfield Town
Potteries derby: Port Vale vs. Stoke City
Second City derby: Aston Villa vs. Birmingham City
Shrewsbury-Walsall rivalry: Shrewsbury Town vs. Walsall
Shrewsbury-Wolves rivalry: Shrewsbury Town vs. Wolverhampton Wanderers
Shropshire derby: Shrewsbury Town vs. A.F.C. Telford United
Staffordshire derby: 
Hednesford Town vs. Stafford Rangers
Port Vale vs. Walsall
Stoke City vs. Wolverhampton Wanderers
Stoke City vs. West Bromwich Albion
West Midlands derby:
Aston Villa–West Brom rivalry: Aston Villa vs. West Bromwich Albion
Black Country derby: West Bromwich Albion vs Wolverhampton Wanderers
Villa-Wolves rivalry: Aston Villa vs. Wolverhampton Wanderers
Birmingham City-West Brom rivalry: Birmingham City vs. West Bromwich Albion
Birmingham City-Wolves rivalry: Birmingham City vs. Wolverhampton Wanderers
Walsall-Wolves rivalry: Walsall vs. Wolverhampton Wanderers

North-Eastern England
Auckland derby: West Auckland Town vs. Bishop Auckland F.C.
Billingham derby: Billingham Synthonia vs. Billingham Town
Blyth-Gateshead derby: Blyth Spartans vs. Gateshead F.C.
Darlington-Spennymoor rivalry: Darlington F.C vs. Spennymoor Town
Darlington-York Rivalry: Darlington F.C. v York City
East Durham Derby: refers to matches between Easington Colliery, Horden C.W. and Seaham Red Star F.C.
Lincolnshire derby: refers to any match between Lincoln City, Boston United, Gainsborough Trinity, Grimsby Town and Scunthorpe United
Humber derby: refers to any match between Grimsby Town, Hull City, and Scunthorpe United
North-east derby: Blyth Spartans vs. Hartlepool United
Ryhope Derby: Sunderland R.C.A. v Ryhope C.W.
Teesside derby: Darlington vs. Hartlepool United
Teesside derby: Guisborough Town vs. Redcar Athletic
Tees-Wear derby: Middlesbrough vs. Sunderland
The Shields derby: North Shields F.C. vs. South Shields F.C.
Tyne-Tees derby: Newcastle United vs. Middlesbrough
Tyne-Wear derby: Newcastle United vs. Sunderland

North-West England and Yorkshire

A62 derby: Huddersfield Town vs. Oldham Athletic
A627 derby: Oldham Athletic vs. Rochdale
Accrington-Morecambe rivalry: Accrington Stanley vs. Morecambe
Ashton derby: Ashton United vs. Curzon Ashton
Barnsley-Leeds rivalry: Barnsley F.C. vs. Leeds United
Blackburn-Preston rivalry: Blackburn Rovers vs. Preston North End
Bolton-Oldham rivalry: Bolton Wanderers vs. Oldham Athletic
Bolton-Tranmere rivalry: Bolton Wanderers vs. Tranmere Rovers
Bolton–Wigan rivalry: Bolton Wanderers vs. Wigan Athletic
Burnley-Rochdale rivalry: Burnley vs. Rochdale
Burnley-Preston rivalry: Burnley vs. Preston North End
Cheshire derby: Altrincham F.C. vs. Stockport County
Chester-Tranmere rivalry: Chester vs. Tranmere Rovers
Cumbrian derby: Barrow vs. Carlisle United
Woolyback derby: Southport vs. Tranmere Rovers
East Lancashire derby: Burnley vs. Blackburn Rovers
Fleetwood-Morecambe rivalry: Fleetwood Town vs. Morecambe
Fleetwood-Southport rivalry: Fleetwood Town vs. Southport
Fylde Coast derby: Blackpool vs. Fleetwood Town
Manchester derby: Manchester City vs. Manchester United
Merseyside derby: Everton vs. Liverpool, also includes any combination of games against Tranmere Rovers or Southport
Northwest derby: Liverpool vs Manchester United
Liverpool F.C.–Manchester City F.C. rivalry: Liverpool vs Manchester City
Northwich derby: Games between 1874 Northwich, Northwich Victoria and Witton Albion
Oldham-Stockport rivalry: Oldham Athletic vs. Stockport County
Rules derby: Hallam vs. Sheffield; the oldest derby in football
South Yorkshire derby: 
Barnsley-Rotherham rivalry: Barnsley vs. Rotherham United
Barnsley-Doncaster rivalry: Barnsley F.C. vs. Doncaster Rovers
Doncaster-Rotherham rivalry: Doncaster Rovers vs. Rotherham United
Steel City derby: Sheffield United vs. Sheffield Wednesday
Tameside derby: Hyde United vs. Stalybridge Celtic
War of the Roses: Leeds United vs. Manchester United
West Lancashire derby: Blackpool vs. Preston North End
West Yorkshire derby: refers to any match between Bradford City, Huddersfield Town and Leeds United In the Northern Premier League, there is also Liversedge F.C. v Ossett United.
Wool City derby: Bradford City vs. Bradford Park Avenue

Southern England

A4 derby: Bath City vs. Chippenham Town
A27 derby: Bognor Regis Town vs. Whitehawk
A259 derby: Peacehaven & Telscombe vs. Newhaven
Bristol derby: Bristol City vs. Bristol Rovers
Cathedral City derby: Salisbury vs. Winchester City
Coxbridge derby: Badshot Lea vs. Farnham Town
Devon derby: Games between Exeter City, Plymouth Argyle or Torquay United
Dockyard derby: Plymouth Argyle vs. Portsmouth
Dorset derby: Games between Dorchester Town, Poole Town, Weymouth and Wimborne Town
Eastbourne derby: Games played between Eastbourne Borough, Eastbourne Town, Eastbourne United and Langney Wanderers
East Sussex derby: Eastbourne Borough vs. Lewes
El Creekio: AFC Portchester vs. Fareham Town
Gloucestershire derby: Games played between Cheltenham Town, Forest Green Rovers and Gloucester City
Hampshire–Surrey derby: Aldershot Town vs. Woking
Kent derby: Gillingham vs. Maidstone United;
Mid Hampshire derby: Totton vs. Winchester City,
Mole Valley derby: Dorking Wanderers vs Leatherhead
New Forest derby: Bournemouth vs Southampton
North Devon derby: Games between Barnstaple Town Bideford F.C. and Ilfracombe Town 
Rushmoor derby: Aldershot Town vs. Farnborough
Seaside derby: Bognor Regis Town vs Worthing
Somerset derby: Yeovil Town vs. Bath City
South Coast derby: Portsmouth vs. Southampton
South Hampshire derby: Gosport Borough vs. Havant & Waterlooville
South Midlands derby: Gloucester City vs. Worcester City
Sussex derby: Lewes F.C. vs. Worthing F.C.
Thanet derby: Margate vs. Ramsgate
Walton derby: Walton Casuals vs Walton & Hersham
West Country derby: 
Bristol Rovers vs. Exeter City
Bristol City vs. Plymouth Argyle
Bristol Rovers vs. Torquay United
Bristol Rovers vs. Cheltenham Town
Cheltenham Town vs. Swindon Town
Exeter City vs. Plymouth Argyle
Yeovil Town vs. Bath City
Yeovil Town vs. Weymouth

Wales

South Wales derby: Cardiff City vs. Swansea City

Inter-regional

A13 derby: Leyton Orient vs. Southend United
A500 derby: Crewe Alexandra vs. Port Vale
Aldershot-Reading rivalry: Aldershot Town vs. Reading
Arsenal-Stoke rivalry: Arsenal vs. Stoke City
Cambridge–Colchester rivalry: Cambridge United vs. Colchester United 
Chesterfield-Sheffield rivalry: Chesterfield vs. Sheffield United or Sheffield Wednesday
Crewe-Walsall rivalry: Crewe Alexandra vs. Walsall
Dons Derby: AFC Wimbledon vs. Milton Keynes Dons
England-Wales rivalries:
Cardiff City–Leeds United rivalry: Cardiff City vs Leeds United
Cross-border derby: Chester vs. Wrexham
Severnside derby: Primarily refers to Bristol City vs. Cardiff City but may also refer to Bristol Rovers or Newport County
Shrewsbury-Wrexham rivalry: Shrewsbury Town vs. Wrexham
Tranmere-Wrexham rivalry: Tranmere Rovers vs. Wrexham
Everton-Watford rivalry: Everton vs. Watford
Gillingham-London rivalries:
Gillingham-Charlton Rivalry: Gillingham vs. Charlton Athletic
Gillingham-Millwall Rivalry: Gillingham vs. Millwall
Gillingham–Southend rivalry: Gillingham vs. Southend United
Gillingham-Swindon Rivalry: Gillingham vs. Swindon Town
Hertfordshire-London rivalries:
 QPR-Watford rivalry: QPR vs. Watford F.C.
 Brentford-Watford rivalry: Brentford vs. Watford F.C.
 Crystal Palace-Watford rivalry: Crystal Palace vs. Watford F.C.
 Barnet-Boreham Wood rivalry: Barnet F.C. vs. Boreham Wood F.C.
 Boreham Wood-Wealdstone rivalry: Boreham Wood F.C. vs. Wealdstone F.C.
 London-Leeds rivalries:
 Brentford-Leeds rivalry: Brentford vs. Leeds United
 Chelsea–Leeds rivalry: Chelsea vs. Leeds United
 Leeds United–Millwall rivalry: Leeds United vs. Millwall
 London-Liverpool rivalries:
 Chelsea–Liverpool rivalry: Chelsea vs. Liverpool
 Everton–Millwall rivalry: Everton vs. Millwall
 London-Manchester rivalries:
 Arsenal–Manchester United rivalry: Arsenal vs Manchester United
 Chelsea–Manchester United rivalry: Chelsea vs. Manchester United
 Luton-York rivalry: Luton Town F.C. vs. York City
Brighton-Crystal Palace Rivalry: Brighton & Hove Albion vs. Crystal Palace
West Country derby: 
Bristol Rovers–Swindon Town rivalry: Bristol Rovers vs. Swindon Town
Swindon Town vs. Yeovil Town
Cheltenham Town vs. Swindon Town

Defunct derbies
 A49 derby: Hereford United vs Shrewsbury Town
Aldershot-Reading rivalry: Aldershot vs. Reading
Bishop Auckland-Spennymoor derby: Bishop Auckland F.C. vs. Spennymoor United
Bolton-Bury rivalry: Bolton Wanderers vs. Bury
Bury–Oldham rivalry: Bury vs. Oldham Athletic
Cheshire derby:
Altrincham-Macclesfield rivalry: Altrincham vs. Macclesfield Town
Chester F.C. vs. Macclesfield Town
Crewe Alexandra vs. Macclesfield Town
Crystal Palace-Wimbledon derby: Crystal Palace vs. Wimbledon
South Lancashire derby: Bury vs. Rochdale
Denbighshire derby: Rhyl F.C. vs. Prestatyn Town
Dorking derby: Dorking vs. Dorking Wanderers
Halifax-York rivalry: Halifax Town A.F.C. vs. York City
Ossett derby: Ossett Albion vs. Ossett Town
North Yorkshire derby: Scarborough F.C. vs. York City
Shropshire derby: Shrewsbury Town vs Telford United
Sunderland derby: Sunderland A.F.C. vs. Sunderland Albion
West Yorkshire derby: Only those derbies are defunct that included the now defunct club Halifax Town vs. Bradford City, Huddersfield Town or Leeds United
Wirral derby: New Brighton vs. Tranmere Rovers
Halifax-Rochdale: Halifax Town A.F.C. vs. Rochdale

Northern Ireland
Belfast derbies:
Big Two derby: Linfield v Glentoran
North Belfast derby: Crusaders v Cliftonville
Linfield v Cliftonville
Donegal Celtic vs. Linfield
Glentoran vs. Crusaders or Cliftonville
Mid-Ulster derby: Glenavon vs. Portadown
A26 derby: Ballymena United vs. Coleraine
North Down derby: Ards vs. Bangor F.C.
East Antrim derby: Carrick Rangers vs. Larne vs. Ballyclare Comrades
Lurgan derby: Glenavon vs. Lurgan Celtic
North-West derby: Coleraine vs. Limavady United vs. Institute
Mourne derby: Newry City vs. Warrenpoint Town

Scotland

League
Alloa-Falkirk derby: Alloa Athletic vs. Falkirk
Alloa-Stirling derby: Alloa Athletic vs. Stirling Albion
Angus derby: Arbroath vs. Montrose vs. Brechin City vs. Forfar Athletic
Ayrshire derby: Ayr United vs. Kilmarnock
Buchan derby: Fraserburgh vs. Peterhead
Dunbartonshire derby: Dumbarton vs. Clydebank
Dundee derby: Dundee vs. Dundee United
Edinburgh Derbies:
Edinburgh derby: Heart of Midlothian vs. Hibernian - first played Christmas 1875  
Other Edinburgh derby: Edinburgh City v Spartans
Falkirk derby: East Stirlingshire vs. Falkirk
Falkirk district derby: East Stirlingshire vs. Stenhousemuir
Fife derby: any combination of Dunfermline Athletic, Raith Rovers, Cowdenbeath and East Fife
Glasgow-Renfrewshire Derby:  Greenock Morton vs. Partick Thistle
Renfrewshire Derby: St Mirren Vs. Greenock Morton
Glasgow derbies: 
Rangers -Partick Thistle derby: Rangers vs. Partick Thistle
Clyde-Partick Thistle derby: Clyde vs. Partick Thistle
Old Firm: Celtic vs. Rangers 
Original Glasgow derby: Queens Park vs. Rangers
Highland derbies:
Highland derby: Inverness Caledonian Thistle vs. Ross County
Elgin-Peterhead derby: Elgin City vs. Peterhead 
Brora-Wick derby: Brora Rangers v Wick Academy
Kincardine derby: Dunfermline Athletic vs. Falkirk
Lanarkshire derby: Motherwell vs. Hamilton Academical vs. Airdrieonians
Monklands derby: Airdrieonians vs. Albion Rovers
New Firm: Aberdeen vs. Dundee United
North derbies:
North derby: Aberdeen v Inverness Caledonian Thistle 
Elgin-Peterhead rivalry: Elgin City v Peterhead
Renfrewshire derby: Greenock Morton vs. St Mirren
Tayside derby: 
Dundee vs. St Johnstone
Dundee United vs. St Johnstone
South-West derby: Queen of the South vs. Stranraer vs. Ayr United vs. Kilmarnock

Non-League
 Caithness-Sutherland derby: Brora Rangers vs. Wick Academy
Southside Glasgow Derby: Pollok F.C. v Arthurlie F.C.
Ayrshire Derby: Auchinleck Talbot vs. Cumnock Juniors
Caithness Derby: Thurso vs. Halkirk United
Western Fife derby: Hill of Beath Hawthorn vs. Kelty Hearts
Junior old firm: St Roch's vs. Larkhall Thistle
Larkhall derby: Royal Albert vs. Larkhall Thistle
Beith Juniors vs Kilbirnie Ladeside
Bo'ness United vs Linlithgow Rose
Cambuslang Rangers vs Rutherglen Glencairn
Calmac Cup: Eriskay vs. Barra
Marymass derby: Irvine Meadow vs. Irvine Victoria

Defunct
Inverness derby: Caledonian F.C. vs. Inverness Thistle F.C.

See also
List of association football rivalries, which lists other football club rivalries around the world
List of sports rivalries in the United Kingdom, which lists other sports rivalries in the United Kingdom

References

External links
FootballDerbies.com – a list of football derbies, as well as non-derby rivalries

 *
Sports rivalries in the United Kingdom